Hizli Gazeteci is a daily comic strip hero from Turkey. Created by Necdet Sen. It may be translated as "Speedy Journalist". First appeared in a music magazine that called "Hey" in December 1980. It was published in daily newspapers Cumhuriyet and Hürriyet between 1984 and 1996.

HIZLI Gazeteci strips tells satirical stories of a lonely and sarcastic journalist. The serial has discussed by intellectuals and media during publishing period. The author judged two times for insulting president, police and army.

After 2002, all of HIZLI Gazeteci stories reprinted as albums from Parantez Books.

Sources
Author's website
HIZLI Gazeteci's website

Turkish comic strips
1980 comics debuts
1996 comics endings
Satirical comics
Fictional reporters
Comics characters introduced in 1980